Lynetta Kizer (born April 4, 1990) is an American-Bosnian professional basketball player. She also works as a basketball trainer for a company called Beltway Trainer.

Early life and high school career
Lynetta Janae Kizer was born on April 4, 1990, in Woodbridge, Virginia. She is a middle child, having one older brother named Dominique and a younger sister named Quiana.
 
Lynetta Kizer attended Potomac Senior High School, where she played all four years as a starting center. She was also a three-time team captain. By her senior year, Kizer was rated the fifth overall prospect and the top center in the nation in the 2008 class, according to HoopGurlz.com. Her high school exploits earned her a scholarship from the Anne & Bob Strahota Director's Circle. She went on to play college basketball for the University of Maryland.

College career
While attending the University of Maryland, Kizer played center on the Terrapin's women's basketball team. By her senior year in 2012, Kizer earned All-ACC Honorable Mention and was named the 6th Player of the year. While at Maryland, Kizer was a Family Science major.

Maryland statistics
Source

USA Basketball

Kizer was a member of the USA Women's U18 team which won the gold medal at the FIBA Americas Championship in Buenos Aires, Argentina. The event was held in July 2008, when the USA team defeated host Argentina to win the championship. Kizer helped the team win all five games, scoring 8.6 points per game.

Kizer played on the team presenting the US at the 2011 World University Games held in Shenzhen, China. The team, coached by Bill Fennelly, won all six games to earn the gold medal. Kizer averaged 7.0 points per game.

Professional career
At 6 feet 4 inches tall (1.93 meters), Kizer previously played the center position during her high school and college years. Upon entering the professional league, Kizer played as a forward in some instances but mostly played as a center on international teams.

Tulsa Shock (2012)
Kizer was the 29th overall pick, in the third Round of the 2012 WNBA Draft, joining the Tulsa Shock basketball club. She played in 22 games.

Phoenix Mercury (2012-2013)
Kizer played five games for the Phoenix Mercury.

KB Stars (2012-2013)
As a center, Kizer played 17 games KB Stars.

Good Angels Košice (2013-2014)
Kizer was part of the Good Angels Košice during the 2013-2014 season. She appeared on the roster for two games, but did not receive any playing time.

Indiana Fever (2014-2016)
Kizer played 17 games during the course of three seasons with the Indiana Fever.

Bosnian National Team
On May 14, 2015 it was announced that Kizer would be a member of the Bosnian National Basketball Team.

Galatasaray S.K. (2015-2016)
Kizer played 12 games for Galatasaray S.K.

Olympiacos (2016-2017)
Kizer played 24 games for Olympiacos Pireus during the 2016-17 season.

Connecticut Sun (2017)
On February 21, 2017 Kizer was traded to the Connecticut Sun along with the eighth overall pick in the 2017 WNBA Draft, in exchange for Camille Little and Jillian Alleyne. She started 1 out of 20 games and missed 16 games due to a back injury. She played 15 games during her first and only season.

Shandong Six Stars (2017-2018)
Kizer played 17 games in the WCBA during the 2017 and 2018 seasons as part of the Shandong Six Stars.

Minnesota Lynx (2018)
Kizer was signed to the Minnesota Lynx in February 2018. She played 15 games before later being waived in June 2018.

Fenerbahçe S.K. (2018)
Following her departure from the WNBA Lynx, Kizer joined the Fenerbahçe S.K.

CCC Polkowice (2018-2019)
Played 23 games for CCC Polkowice.

Atlanta Dream (2019)
Kizer returned to the WNBA as a member of the Atlanta Dream.

Della Fiore Broni (2021)
Kizer played in the Italian Women's Basketball League as a member of the Della Fiore Broni. She played four games during the 2021 season.

Çankaya University Sports Club (2021)
Kizer played four games for the Çankaya University Sports Club.

Panathinaikos (2021-2022)
On 28 November 2021, Kizer signed with Panathinaikos women's basketball team of the Greek women's basketball league. She was waived by the team on 4 May 2022.

WNBA career statistics

Regular season

|-
| align="left" | 2012
| align="left" | Tulsa
| 7 || 0 || 9.4 || .176 || .000 || .929 || 2.1 || 0.0 || 0.6 || 0.0 || 0.4 || 2.7
|-
| align="left" | 2012
| align="left" | Phoenix
| 15 || 0 || 15.6 || .444 || .750 || .941 || 3.4 || 0.5 || 0.4 || 0.1 || 1.1 || 7.1
|-
| align="left" | 2013
| align="left" | Phoenix
| 27 || 0 || 9.9 || .449 || .000 || .643 || 2.1 || 0.2 || 0.4 || 0.2 || 0.8 || 2.6
|-
| align="left" | 2014
| align="left" | Indiana
| 31 || 1 || 9.0 || .431 || .000 || .619 || 2.4 || 0.1 || 0.3 || 0.3 || 0.8 || 3.8
|-
| align="left" | 2015
| align="left" | Indiana
| 33 || 14 || 17.9 || .491 || .000 || .879 || 3.5 || 0.4 || 0.6 || 0.2 || 1.4 || 8.3
|-
| align="left" | 2016
| align="left" | Indiana
| 33 || 12 || 17.2 || .556 || .000 || .8000 || 3.2 || 0.6 || 0.8 || 0.3 || 1.1 || 9.6
|-
| align="left" | 2017
| align="left" | Connecticut
| 20 || 1 || 11.9 || .480 || .000 || .767 || 2.9 || 0.3 || 0.6 || 0.4 || 0.5 || 6.0
|-
| align="left" | 2018
| align="left" | Minnesota
| 14 || 0 || 5.6 || .242 || .000 || .600 || 1.5 || 0.6 || 0.1 || 0.0 || 0.4 || 1.6
|-
| align="left" | Career
| align="left" | 7 years, 5 teams
| 180 || 28 || 12.9 || .477 || .214 || .799 || 2.8 || 0.3 || 0.5 || 0.2 || 0.9 || 5.8

Playoffs

|-
| align="left" | 2013
| align="left" | Phoenix
| 5 || 0 || 9.4 || .727 || .000 || .000 || 1.2 || 0.0 || 0.4 || 0.2 || 0.4 || 3.2 
|-
| align="left" | 2014
| align="left" | Indiana
| 5 || 0 || 6.0 || .429 || .000 || .750 || 1.2 || 0.6 || 0.2 || 0.4 || 0.0 || 3.0
|-
| align="left" | 2015
| align="left" | Indiana
| 9 || 0 || 8.9 || .414 || .000 || .750 || 2.4 || 0.2 || 0.3 || 0.1 || 0.8 || 3.0
|-
| align="left" | 2016
| align="left" | Indiana
| 1 || 0 || 13.0 || .667 || .000 || .000 || 2.0 || 0.0 || 0.0 || 0.0 || 0.0 || 4.0
|-
| align="left" | Career
| align="left" | 4 years, 2 teams
| 20 || 0 || 8.5 || .491 || .000 || .667 || 1.8 || 0.3 || 0.3 || 0.2 || 0.5 || 3.1

References

External links
Kizer at WNBA.com

1990 births
Living people
Basketball players from Virginia
Bosnia and Herzegovina women's basketball players
American women's basketball players
African-American basketball players
American emigrants to Bosnia and Herzegovina
Naturalized citizens of Bosnia and Herzegovina
Bosnia and Herzegovina people of African-American descent
Bosnia and Herzegovina expatriate basketball people in Greece
Centers (basketball)
Connecticut Sun players
Olympiacos Women's Basketball players
Panathinaikos WBC players
Indiana Fever players
Maryland Terrapins women's basketball players
McDonald's High School All-Americans
Minnesota Lynx players
Parade High School All-Americans (girls' basketball)
Phoenix Mercury players
Tulsa Shock draft picks
Tulsa Shock players
Universiade medalists in basketball
Sportspeople from Fairfax County, Virginia
People from Fort Belvoir, Virginia
American expatriate basketball people in China
Shandong Six Stars players
Universiade gold medalists for the United States
Medalists at the 2011 Summer Universiade
United States women's national basketball team players
21st-century African-American sportspeople